The International Council of Thirteen Indigenous Grandmothers is an international alliance of indigenous female elders that focuses on issues such as the environment, internationalism, and human rights. The group met for the first time in October 2004 at the Dalai Lama's Menla Retreat Center on Panther Mountain in Phoenicia, New York, during which time they declared themselves a council. Academic Suzanne Bouclin described them as "an alliance of thirteen women elders from across the globe that was organized to uphold indigenous practices and ceremonies and affirm the right to use plant medicines free of legal restriction."

Council members
The grandmothers include:
 Agnes Baker Pilgrim  (Elected Chairperson) – Takelma, Confederated Tribes of Siletz – Grants Pass, Oregon, USA
 Rita Pitka Blumenstein – Yup’ik – Alaska, USA
 Aama Bombo – Tamang – Nepal
 Flordemayo – Mayan – Highlands of Central America/ New Mexico
 Maria Alice Campos Freire – Amazonian Rainforest, Brazil
 Rita Long Visitor Holy Dance – Oglala Lakota – Black Hills, South Dakota, USA
 Clara Shinobu Iura – Amazonian Rainforest, Brazil
 Bernadette Rebienot – Omyene – Gabon, Africa

Former members
 Margaret Behan – Arapaho/Cheyenne – Montana, USA
 Julieta Casimiro Estrada – Mazatec – Huautla de Jimenez, Mexico (deceased)
 Tsering Dolma Gyaltong – Tibetan (deceased)
 Beatrice Long Visitor Holy Dance – Oglala Lakota – Black Hills, South Dakota, USA (deceased)
 Mona Polacca – Hopi/Havasupai/Tewa – Arizona, USA

Ambassadors 
Several others have been involved in supporting the council's work, including:

 Pauline Tangiora – Māori elder from New Zealand and councillor of World Future Council
 Jeneane Prevatt ("Jyoti") – 'Traveling Ambassador Charged with The Mission'
 Madrinha Rita Gregório – Amazon Rainforest, Brazil
 Constance de Pauliac – France

Council meetings
The council meets every six months, visiting each other's homelands. Their goals are to "build our relations and learn about each other's cultures". During these meetings the grandmothers wear traditional dress and hold a seven-day prayer vigil. The 2007 meeting in the Black Hills of South Dakota brought together 250 participants from the United States, South America, Europe, Asia and Oceania.

In July 2008 the council met in Rome to address the Vatican regarding the Inter caetera, a Papal Bull of 1493 that authorized the conversion to Christianity of the indigenous people of the newly discovered Americas. They laid a "flag of peace and conciliation" in front of Saint Peter's Basilica, as well as a written statement and gifts to Pope Benedict XVI. The grandmothers also lit smudging incense and prayed. The Vatican declined to receive them.

Media

In 2006 Carol Schaefer's book Grandmothers Counsel the World: Women Elders Offer Their Vision for Our Planet was published by Trumpeter Books, an imprint of Shambhala Publications. In 2009 it released a Kindle edition. A Spanish edition was published in 2008.

In 2007 the Center for Sacred Studies, the parent organization of the Grandmother's Council, produced a documentary titled For the Next 7 Generations: The Grandmothers Speak. Directed by Carole Hart, it documented the Grandmothers as they met and traveled around the world.

Fran Markover's poem about the group, The Grandmothers, is based on a quote by Bernadette Rebienot. It won first place in the 2008 Ithaca College magazine arts and literature contest.

In 2011 Rita Pitka Blumenstein from Alaska and Mona Polacca from Arizona started a 22-city "Timeless Message Tour" speaking about the group and showing "For the Next 7 Generations".

Awards 
In 2013, the Fellowship of Reconciliation awarded the Council of Thirteen Indigenous Grandmothers the International Pfeffer Peace Award for their work for peace and justice throughout the world.

References

Further reading

 Includes multiple audio interviews.

External links 
 
 Official website for documentary For The Next Seven Generations 
 IMDb listing of For The Next Seven Generations
 Turning Prayer into Action TV documentary of Grandmothers dialogue with Bioneers
 13 Indigenous Grandmothers Gathering in Lame Deer, Montana, July, 2012, Part 2, video panel by Vashon Intuitive Arts participants

 

Indigenous rights organizations
Non-profit organizations based in California
Organizations established in 2004
Pfeffer Peace Prize laureates
Indigenous women of the Americas